Events in the year 1947 in Brazil.

Incumbents

Federal government
 President: Marshal Eurico Gaspar Dutra 
 Vice President: Nereu Ramos

Governors 
 Alagoas: Antonio Guedes de Miranda (till 29 March); Silvestre Pericles (from 29 March)
 Amazonas: 
 till 1 March: Siseno Sarmento
 1 March-8 May: João Nogueira da Mata
 from 8 May: Leopoldo da Silva Amorim Neves
 Bahia: Cândido Caldas then Otávio Mangabeira 
 Ceará: 
 till 3 February: José Machado Lopes
 3 February-1 March: José Feliciano de Ataíde 
 from 1 March: Faustino de Albuquerque
 Espírito Santo: Moacir Ubirajara da Silva (till 29 March); Carlos Fernando Monteiro Lindenberg (from 29 March)
 Goiás: Joaquim Machado de Araújo (till 22 March); Jerônimo Coimbra Bueno (from 22 March)
 Maranhão: Saturnino Bello 
 Mato Grosso: Jose Marcelo Moreira then Arnaldo Estêvão de Figueiredo
 Minas Gerais: Alcides Lins (till 19 March); Milton Soares Campos (from 19 March)
 Pará: José Faustino Santos (till 11 March); Luís de Moura Carvalho (from 11 March)
 Paraíba: José Gomes da Silva (till 4 March); Osvaldo Trigueiro (from 4 March)
 Paraná: Antônio Augusto de Carvalho Chaves then Moisés Lupion 
 Pernambuco: Demerval Peixoto
 Rio de Janeiro: Hugo Silva 
 Rio Grande do Norte: 
 until 15 January: Ubaldo Bezerra de Melo
 15 January-31 July: Orestes da Rocha Lima
 from 31 July: José Augusto Varela 
 Rio Grande do Sul: Pompílio Cylon Fernandes Rosa (till 26 March); Walter Só Jobim (from 26 March)
 Santa Catarina: Aderbal Ramos da Silva 
 São Paulo: José Carlos de Macedo Soares (till 14 March); Ademar de Barros (from 14 March)
 Sergipe: 
 till 30 January: Antônio de Freitas Brandão
 30 January-29 March: Joaquim Sabino Ribeiro
 from 29 March: Jose Rollemberg

Vice governors
 Ceará: Osvaldo da Costa e Silva 
 Espírito Santo: José Rodrigues Sette 
 Goiás: Hosanah de Campos Guimarães 
 Maranhão: Saturnino Bello (from 22 October)
 Minas Gerais: José Ribeiro Pena (from 4 September)
 Paraíba: José Targino Pereira da Costa (from 1947)
 Piauí: Osvaldo da Costa e Silva (from 28 April)
 Rio Grande do Norte: Tomaz Salustino (from 31 July)
 São Paulo: Luís Gonzaga Novelli Júnior (from 28 November)

Events

19 January - Parliamentary elections are held, for 19 vacant seats in the Chamber of Deputies, one additional Senator for each state (except Santa Catarina, which elected two), and for all state Governors and legislatures   The Brazilian Communist Party wins nearly 10% of the vote in the state elections, becoming the third party in the state of São Paulo (ahead of the UDN) and the single largest party in the federal capital, Rio de Janeiro.
31 May-17 June - The South American Basketball Championship 1947 is held in Rio de Janeiro. 
6 August - The Brazilian Socialist Party is founded.
2 October - The São Paulo Museum of Art opens to the public.
22 December - The airline Lóide Aéreo Nacional is founded by Ruy Vacani.

Arts and culture

Books
Mario de Andrade - Contos Novos (posthumously published)

Films
The End of the River (British film made in Brazil), directed by Derek Twist

Music
Valdir Azevedo - "Brasileirinho"

Births
25 January - Tostão, footballer
4 February - Garibaldi Alves Filho, politician
5 February - Regina Duarte, actress and politician
16 July - Valnice Milhomens, pastor, apostle, author and televangelist
26 July - Siron Franco, painter, designer and sculptor
24 August - Paulo Coelho, novelist
17 October - Nuno Leal Maia, actor
14 December - Dilma Rousseff, 36th President of Brazil

Deaths
12 January - Júlio Afrânio Peixoto, physician, politician and writer (born 1876)
21 April - Heitor da Silva Costa, civil engineer, designer and constructor of the Christ the Redeemer monument in Rio de Janeiro (born 1873)
21 July - Johann Baptist Reus, German-Brazilian Jesuit leader (born 1868)

References

See also 
1947 in Brazilian football
List of Brazilian films of 1947

 
1940s in Brazil
Years of the 20th century in Brazil
Brazil
Brazil